The Rays were an American group formed in New York City in 1955, and active into the early 1960s. They first recorded for Chess Records.  Their biggest hit single was "Silhouettes", a moderately-slow doo-wop piece of pop music that reached number 3 on the Billboard Hot 100 in 1957 on Cameo after being initially released on the small XYZ Records. It sold over one million copies, and was awarded a gold disc. The song was written by Bob Crewe and Frank Slay, Jr. Also on XYZ, they had a minor hit with "Mediterranean Moon" a mid-chart hit with "Magic Moon" (by this time, XYZ was being nationally distributed by London Records).

They also recorded the original version of "Daddy Cool", which was used as part of a medley with Little Richard's "The Girl Can't Help It", for the UK band Darts which made number 6 in the UK Singles Chart in 1977. The song also lent its name to the Australian band Daddy Cool, who recorded the song in 1971.

"Silhouettes" was also released by The Diamonds in 1957 reaching number 10 on the charts and later in a slightly faster cover version by Herman's Hermits in 1965, reaching number 5 on the US chart. It was also covered by Bob Dylan, but still unreleased, from his Basement Tapes sessions in the late 1960s.

Group members
Harold Miller – (lead singer) – (born Brooklyn, New York City)
Walter Ford – (tenor) – (born Lexington, Kentucky)
David Jones – (tenor) – (born Brooklyn, New York)
Harry James – (baritone) – (born Brooklyn, New York)

Billboard singles
1957  "Silhouettes" US Black Singles number 3 
1957  "Silhouettes" U.S. Pop Singles number 3
1960  "Mediterranean Moon" U.S. Billboard Hot 100 number 95
1961  "Magic Moon (Clair de lune)" U.S. Billboard Hot 100 number 49

References

External links

The Rays – brief history

Musical groups established in 1955
Musical groups from New York City
African-American musical groups
American rhythm and blues musical groups
Chess Records artists
1955 establishments in New York City